Taedonggang-guyŏk, or Taedong River District, is one of the 18 guyŏk, and one of the six that constitute East Pyongyang, North Korea.  Taedonggang-guyŏk is on the eastern bank of the Taedong River, north of Tongdaewŏn-guyŏk and west of Sadong-guyŏk (Sadong District).  It was established in January 1958.

Administrative divisions
Taedonggang-guyŏk is divided into 25 tong (neighbourhoods):

 Ch'ŏngryu 1-dong 청류 1동 (淸流 1洞) 
 Ch'ŏngryu 2-dong 청류 2동 (淸流 2洞) 
 Ch'ŏngryu 3-dong 청류 3동 (淸流 3洞)
 Munhŭng 1-dong 문흥 1동 (文興 1洞)
 Munhŭng 2-dong 문흥 2동 (文興 2洞)
 Munsu 1-dong 문수 1동 (紋繡 1洞) 
 Munsu 2-dong 문수 2동 (紋繡 2洞) 
 Munsu 3-dong 문수 3동 (紋繡 3洞) 
 Puksu-dong 북수동 (北繡洞)
 Ongryu 1-dong 옥류 1동 (玉流 1洞) 
 Ongryu 2-dong 옥류 2동 (玉流 2洞) 
 Ongryu 3-dong 옥류 3동 (玉流 3洞) 
 Rŭngra 1-dong 릉라 1동 (綾羅 1洞) 
 Rŭngra 2-dong 릉라 2동 (綾羅 2洞)
 Sagok 1-dong 사곡 1동 (四谷 1洞)
 Sagok 2-dong 사곡 2동 (四谷 2洞) 
 Soryong 1-dong 소룡 1동 (小龍 1洞)
 Soryong 2-dong 소룡 2동 (小龍 2洞)
 Taedonggang-dong 대동강동 (大洞江洞)
 Tongmun 1-dong 동문 1동 (東門 1洞) 
 Tongmun 2-dong 동문 2동 (東門 2洞) 
 T'apchŏ 1-dong 탑제 1동
 T'apchŏ 2-dong  탑제 2동 
 T'apchŏ 3-dong  탑제 3동
 Ŭi'am-dong 의암동 (衣岩洞)

Landmarks
It is home to the Pyongyang University of Music and Dance.

It is connected to Chung-guyok by the Okryu Bridge, and to Rungra Island and Moranbong-guyok by the Rungra Bridge.

References

Districts of Pyongyang